Thomas Livingstone Carlton Taylor (September 17, 1892 – April 5, 1956) was a Major League Baseball player. He played in 26 games in his one-year career. He had a .260 batting average, with 19 hits in 73 at-bats. He batted and threw right-handed.

Taylor was a member of the 1924 World Series championship team.

External links

1892 births
1956 deaths
Washington Senators (1901–1960) players
Major League Baseball third basemen
Baseball players from Texas
Minor league baseball managers
Beaumont Exporters players
Birmingham Barons players
Memphis Chickasaws players
Houston Buffaloes players
New Orleans Pelicans (baseball) players
Nashville Vols players
San Antonio Bears players
Knoxville Smokies players
Charlotte Hornets (baseball) players
Greenville Buckshots players
Rock Island Islanders players
People from Mexia, Texas